The Americas Zone was one of the three zones of the regional Davis Cup competition in 1994.

In the Americas Zone there were three different tiers, called groups, in which teams competed against each other to advance to the upper tier. Winners in Group I advanced to the World Group Qualifying Round, along with losing teams from the World Group first round. Winners of the preliminary rounds joined the remaining teams in the main draw first round, while losing teams competed in the relegation play-off, with the losing team relegated to the Americas Zone Group II in 1995.

Participating nations

Draw

  relegated to Group II in 1995.

  and  advance to World Group Qualifying Round.

Preliminary round

Uruguay vs. Cuba

Peru vs. Mexico

First round

Uruguay vs. Bahamas

Peru vs. Chile

Relegation play-off

Mexico vs. Cuba

Second round

Uruguay vs. Argentina

Peru vs. Brazil

References

External links
Davis Cup official website

Davis Cup Americas Zone
Americas Zone Group I